Sebastian de Klerk is a South African rugby union player for the  in the Currie Cup. His regular position is centre.

He made his debut in the same fixture, coming on as a replacement centre.

Honours

 Currie Cup winner 2022

References

South African rugby union players
Living people
Rugby union centres
Pumas (Currie Cup) players
Year of birth missing (living people)